is a coeducational public junior college in Saiwai-ku, Kawasaki, Kanagawa Prefecture, Japan. The predecessor of the college was founded in 1964, and the college was chartered as a junior college in 1995.

The school specializes in nutrition studies, and in child care.

References

External links
 Official website 

Educational institutions established in 1995
Public universities in Japan
Universities and colleges in Kanagawa Prefecture
Japanese junior colleges
Nursing schools in Japan
Kawasaki, Kanagawa
1995 establishments in Japan